Events in the year 1937 in Japan.

Incumbents
Emperor: Hirohito
Prime Minister: 
Kōki Hirota: until February 2
Senjūrō Hayashi: from February 2 until June 4
Fumimaro Konoe: from June 4

Governors
Aichi Prefecture: Eitaro Shinohara (until 10 February); Kotaro Tanaka (starting 10 February)
Akita Prefecture: Kiyoshi Honma (until 24 June); Kaoru Sasaki (starting 24 June)
Aomori Prefecture: Masanori Ogawa 
Ehime Prefecture: Shizuo Furukawa 
Fukui Prefecture: Masanori Hanyu (until 4 November); Nakano Yoshiro (starting 4 November)
Fukushima Prefecture: Ito Takehiko (until 7 July); Seikichi Kimishima (starting 7 July)
Gifu Prefecture: Chiaki Saka (until 20 February); Miyano Shozo (starting 20 February)
Gunma Prefecture: Seikichi Kimishima (until 7 July); Shozo Tsuchiya (starting 7 July)
Hiroshima Prefecture: Saburo Hayakawa (until 8 January); Aijiro Tomita (starting 8 January)
Ibaraki Prefecture: Ando Kyoushirou (until 8 January); Nobuo Hayashi (starting 8 January)
Ishikawa Prefecture: Masasuke Kodama (until 1938); Shunsuke Kondo (starting 1938)
Iwate Prefecture: Hidehiko Ishiguro (until 5 June); Chiyoji Yukizawa (starting 5 June)
Kagawa Prefecture: Nagatoshi Fujioka (until 24 December); Shojiro Tamada (starting 24 December)
Kumamoto Prefecture: Fujioka Nagawa
Kochi Prefecture: Kobayashi Mitsumasa
Kyoto Prefecture: Keiichi Suzuki
Mie Prefecture: 
 until 8 January: Aijiro Tomita
 8 January-4 November: Ando Kyoushirou
 4 November-24 December: Hanyu Masaki
 starting 24 December: Masatoshi Sato
Miyagi Prefecture: Yoshio Kikuyama
Miyazaki Prefecture: Seiya Mishima (until 7 July); Katsuroku Aikawa (starting 7 July)
Nagano Prefecture: Shinsuke Kondo 
Niigata Prefecture: Sekiya Nobuyuki 
Okayama Prefecture: Hisashi Kurashige 
Okinawa Prefecture: Hisashi Kurashige 
Saga Prefecture: Shizuo Furukawa (until 7 July); Tomoichi Koyama (starting 7 July)
Saitama Prefecture: Jitsuzo Kawanishi 
Shiname Prefecture: Kyuichi Kodama
Tochigi Prefecture: Hachimintsu Matsumura (until 1 October); Adachi Shuuritsu (starting 1 October)
Tokyo: Tetsuji Kan 
Toyama Prefecture: Ginjiro Toki 
Yamagata Prefecture: Takei Yoshitsugu

Events
January 4 - Two plates containing 58 scales are stolen off of the kinshachi (a kind of dolphin fish) affixed to the top of the castle tower of Nagoya Castle. The culprit was apprehended 23 days later.
February 11 – Hasegawa Builder Corporation, as predecessor of Haseko Corporation founded in Amagasaki, Hyogo Prefecture. 
March 15-May 31 - Nagoya Pan-Pacific Peace Exposition (1937)
March 30 – Marui founded as installndnt credit store in Nakano, Tokyo.
March 31 - 1937 Japanese general election
May – Mitsubishi Real Estate was founded.
July 6 – According to Japanese government official confirmed report, a caught fire in Handa Mental Rescue Hospital in Hiroshima City, kills 23 persons. 
July 7–9 - Marco Polo Bridge Incident
early July-early August - Battle of Beiping-Tianjin
July 26 - Langfang Incident
July 29 - Tungchow Mutiny
August - Operation Chahar
August–November - Tianjin–Pukou Railway Operation
August–December - Beiping-Hankou Railway Operation
August 13-November 26 - Battle of Shanghai
September 1-November 9 - Battle of Taiyuan
September 13-November 11 - Battle of Xinkou
September 24–25 - Battle of Pingxingguan
October 26-November 1 - Defense of Sihang Warehouse
December 12 - USS Panay incident
December 20 – According to former Japan Education Ministry official confirmed report, a caught fire in South Tonda Primary School, Wakayama Prefecture, kills 81 persons, mostly school children.

Births
February 12 – Keisuke Sagawa, actor (d. 2017)
March 25 – Hidekatsu Shibata, actor, voice actor and narrator
April 6 – Minoru Betsuyaku, playwright, novelist, and essayist
April 18 – Keiko Abe, marimba player and composer
May 26 – Monkey Punch, manga artist (Lupin III) (d. 2019)
May 29 – Hibari Misora, singer and actress (d. 1989)
June 25 – Keizō Obuchi, Prime Minister of Japan (d. 2000)
July 14 – Yoshirō Mori, Prime Minister of Japan
July 29 – Ryutaro Hashimoto, Prime Minister of Japan (d. 2006)
August 26 – Kenji Utsumi, actor and voice actor (d. 2013)

Deaths
May 2 – Takuji Iwasaki, meteorologist, biologist, ethnologist historian (b. 1869)
July 16 – Kanichiro Tashiro, lieutenant general (b. 1881)
August 19:
Ikki Kita, philosopher and writer (b 1883)
Asaichi Isobe, army officer (b 1905)
Takaji Muranaka, Army officer (b 1903)
October 22 – Chūya Nakahara, poet (b 1907)
December 6 – Sone Tatsuzō, architect (b 1853)

See also
 List of Japanese films of the 1930s

References

 
1930s in Japan
Japan
Years of the 20th century in Japan